The HX postcode area, also known as the Halifax postcode area, is a group of seven postcode districts in England, within four post towns. These cover most of the Metropolitan Borough of Calderdale in western West Yorkshire, including Halifax, Elland, Sowerby Bridge and Hebden Bridge.



Coverage
The approximate coverage of the postcode districts:

|-
! HX1
| HALIFAX
| Halifax Town Centre, Savile Park
| Calderdale
|-
! HX2
| HALIFAX
| Highroad Well, Illingworth, Luddenden, Luddenden Foot, Midgley, Mixenden, Mount Tabor, Norton Tower, Ogden, Wainstalls, Warley Town
| Calderdale
|-
! HX3
| HALIFAX
| Akroydon, Boothtown, Copley, Hipperholme, Lightcliffe, Northowram, Norwood Green, Ovenden, Shelf, Shibden, Skircoat Green, Southowram
| Calderdale
|-
! HX4
| HALIFAX
| Barkisland, Greetland, Holywell Green, Sowood, Stainland, West Vale
| Calderdale
|-
! HX5
| ELLAND
| Elland, Blackley
| Calderdale
|-
! HX6
| SOWERBY BRIDGE
| Norland, Ripponden, Rishworth, Sowerby, Sowerby Bridge
| Calderdale
|-
! HX7
| HEBDEN BRIDGE
| Cragg Vale, Hebden Bridge, Heptonstall, Mytholmroyd, Old Town 
| Calderdale
|}

Map

See also
Postcode Address File
List of postcode areas in the United Kingdom

References

External links
Royal Mail's Postcode Address File
A quick introduction to Royal Mail's Postcode Address File (PAF)

Calderdale
Postcode areas covering Yorkshire and the Humber
Halifax, West Yorkshire